Jerry L. Dover (October 16, 1949 – March 17, 2000) was an American professional basketball point guard who played one season in the American Basketball Association (ABA) for the Memphis Pros during the 1971–72. He attended Melrose High School in Memphis, Tennessee and later LeMoyne-Owen College.

External links
 

1949 births
2000 deaths
American men's basketball players
Basketball players from Memphis, Tennessee
LeMoyne–Owen Magicians basketball players
Memphis Pros players
Point guards